Sunday Nights: The Songs of Junior Kimbrough is a tribute album for the juke joint blues legend Junior Kimbrough released in January 2005. Junior Kimbrough died in 1998 following a stroke.

Track listing
"You Better Run" [Version #1] performed by Iggy & The Stooges – 3:38
"Sad Days Lonely Nights" performed by Spiritualized – 5:40
"Meet Me in the City" performed by Blues Explosion – 4:03
"Done Got Old" performed by Heartless Bastards – 3:06
"My Mind Is Ramblin'" performed by The Black Keys – 6:51
"I'm Leaving" performed by Fiery Furnaces – 3:49
"I Feel Good Again" performed by Pete Yorn – 3:56
"Do the Rump" performed by Cat Power with Entrance – 3:28
"All Night Long" performed by Mark Lanegan – 4:18
"Release Me" performed by Thee Shams – 4:36
"Done Got Old" performed by Jim White – 2:51
"Lord Have Mercy on Me" performed by Outrageous Cherry – 3:05
"Pull Your Clothes Off" performed by Whitey Kirst – 3:45
"I'm in Love with You" performed by Jack Oblivian – 2:20
"Burn in Hell" performed by The Ponys – 6:13
"You Better Run" [Version #2] performed by Iggy & The Stooges – 5:26

References

Junior Kimbrough albums
Tribute albums
2005 compilation albums